Buffalo Kloof Protected Environment is a large section of protected land near Makhanda (Grahamstown). The Kowie River separates it and the Waters Meeting Nature Reserve.

History 
This  protected area was designated in 2018.

See also 

 List of protected areas of South Africa

References 

Protected areas of South Africa